Range Life Records is an independent record label originally based in Lawrence, Kansas, but now based in San Francisco. It was founded in 2005 by Zach Hangauer. The label name was inspired by the Pavement song "Range Life". The design director of the label is Jeffrey Isom of Pre Sense Form.

Artists
White Flight
1,000,000 Light Years
Fourth of July
Dri
Suzannah Johannes
Say My Name
Coke Weed X
HANZ BRONZE

Catalog
RLR-01 White Flight - White Flight CD/Digital
RLR-02 1,000,000 Light Years - 1,000,000 Light Years EP CD/Digital
RLR-03 Fourth of July - Fourth of July on the Plains CD/Digital
RLR-04 Dri - Smoke Rings CD/Digital
RLR-05 Suzannah Johannes - Suzannah Johannes 7-inch EP/Digital
RLR-06 White Flight - Panther (Single) Digital
RLR-07 Say My Name - Say My Name 12-inch EP/Digital
RLR-08 Fourth Of July - Before Our Hearts Explode! 12-inch LP/Digital
RLR-09 White Flight - Children of Light (Single) Digital
RLR-10  Say My Name - Say My Name 2 Digital
RLR-11 Coke Weed X - "Coke Weed X" Digital
RLR-12 1,000,000 Light Years - "Your Spaceship Awaits You, My Love EP"  Digital
RLR-13 Fourth of July - "Empty Moon" Digital (Digital Distribution only - official release on High Dive Records)
RLR-14 Say My Name - "Malaise Forever" Digital (Digital Distribution only - official release on Foreign Domestic)
RLR-15 Empty Moon - "The Shark" Digital (Digital Distribution only - official release on High Dive Records)
RLR-16 HANZ BRONZE - "Hanz Bronze" Cassette/Digital

See also
Saddle Creek
List of record labels
Pre Sense Form

References

External links
Official website

Companies based in Kansas
Record labels established in 2006
American independent record labels